Exits is the debut album by The Boxer Rebellion,  released on 2 May 2005 via the Mercury record label.
The album combined tracks from the band first EP, "The Boxer Rebellion EP" with a host of new tracks. The song "Watermelon" was used as part of the soundtrack of the game UEFA Euro 2004.

Track listing

References

2005 albums
The Boxer Rebellion (band) albums